Uukule Cluster centre is located in Onyaanya constituency, Namibia, 900m from the B1 road.

The cluster centre has six schools, six principals, 3,002 students, 108 educators and 42 institutional workers. The schools include three primary schools, two combined schools and the Uukule Senior Secondary School.

Uukule Cluster is one of the five cluster centers in Oshikoto region, Namibia. Established in 2001, the center is based at the Uukule Senior Secondary School. It is currently headed by Mr. Angula. Previous heads were Mr. Gwede and Mr. Simasiku.

Oshikoto Region